MEWA may refer to
 MEWA Textil-Management AG, a German textile services company 
 Multiple employer welfare arrangement, a system where a group of employers join together to offer employee benefits for all of their employees